George Sparkes (8 August 1845 – 9 March 1908) was an English first-class cricketer. 

Sparkes was born in August 1845 at Westbourne, Sussex. He made a single appearance in first-class cricket for Sussex against Hampshire in 1875 at Hove.  He was dismissed for ducks in both of Sussex's innings, by Henry Tate in their first-innings and by Arthur Ridley in their second-innings. He died on 9 March 1908 at Old Fishbourne, Sussex.

References

External links

1845 births
1908 deaths
People from Westbourne, West Sussex
English cricketers
Sussex cricketers
People from Fishbourne, West Sussex